Zach Davidson (born July 15, 1998) is an American football tight end for the Buffalo Bills of the National Football League. He played college football at Central Missouri (where he played as punter as well) and was drafted by the Minnesota Vikings in the fifth round of the 2021 NFL Draft.

Early years
Davidson grew up in Webb City, Missouri and attended Webb City High School. He was originally a backup tight end on Webb City's junior varsity team, but became the punter for the varsity team after the Cardinals' regular punter was suspended. He was an All-State selection as a junior and senior at punter.

College career
Davidson began his career at Central Missouri solely as a punter and redshirted his true freshman year. As a redshirt freshman, he set a school record and finished second in the nation with 44.3 yards per punt on 47 punts and was named second-team All-Mid-America Intercollegiate Athletics Association (MIAA). The following season, Davidson was an honorable mention All-MIAA selection at punter and also served as the Mules second tight end, finishing the season with 11 catches for 239 receiving yards and three touchdowns. He had 40 receptions for 894 Yards and 15 touchdowns in his redshirt junior and was named first-team All-MIAA at both punter and tight end as well as a first-team All-American. Davidson opted to forgo his redshirt senior season, which was to be played in the spring due to Covid-19, and enter the 2021 NFL Draft.

Professional career

Minnesota Vikings
Davidson was drafted by the Minnesota Vikings in the fifth round, 168th overall, of the 2021 NFL Draft. He signed his four-year rookie contract on May 13, 2021. He was released on August 31, 2021 and re-signed to the practice squad the next day. He was promoted to the active roster on January 8, 2022.

Davidson was waived on August 30, 2022.

Buffalo Bills
On September 1, 2022, Davidson was signed to the Buffalo Bills practice squad. He signed a reserve/future contract on January 23, 2023.

References

External links
Minnesota Vikings bio
Central Missouri Mules bio

1998 births
Living people
American football punters
American football tight ends
Central Missouri Mules football players
People from Webb City, Missouri
Players of American football from Missouri
Minnesota Vikings players
Buffalo Bills players